Yeta may refer to:

 Yeta, an element of Argentine tango
Port Lihou Island, or Yeta, an island in the Torres Strait
Yeta I, High Chief of the Lozi people in Barotseland, Africa
Yeta II Nalute
Yeta III

See also
Eta (disambiguation)